Ames Municipal Airport  is two miles (3 km) southeast of Ames, in Story County, Iowa. 

Originally consisting of two turf runways, the airport was created after a 1943 vote by the city of Ames. A new terminal and hangar were constructed in 2017, as part of a modernization effort.

Facilities

In the year ending September 30, 2013 the airport had 33,751 aircraft operations: 94% general aviation, 5% air taxi and 1% military. In January 2017, 86 aircraft were based at the airport: 61 single-engine, 7 multi-engine, 2 jet, 13 glider and 3 ultralight.

NTSB records show no fatal accidents at Ames since 1962 (the earliest year which can be searched in their database).

Iowa State University utilizes the airport for charter flights for many of its athletic teams, although its football team must use Des Moines International Airport since Ames does not have runways long enough to accommodate the Boeing 757s and Boeing 767s most frequently used by college football programs for travel.

References

External links 
City of Ames, Iowa

Airports in Iowa
Transportation buildings and structures in Story County, Iowa